Falls Apart may refer to:

 "Falls Apart" (Sugar Ray song), 1998
 "Falls Apart" (Thousand Foot Krutch song), 2007
 "Falls Apart", a 1996 song by Stabbing Westward, from the album Wither Blister Burn & Peel
 "Falls Apart", a 2007 song by Hurt, from the album Vol. 1

See also

 Everything Falls Apart, the second 1983 album by Hüsker Dü
 "When It All Falls Apart", the third single from The Veronicas' debut 2006 album The Secret Life of...
Fall Apart (disambiguation)